HD 63454, formally named Ceibo, is a star  located in the southern circumpolar constellation Chamaeleon near the border with Mensa To see the star, one needs a small telescope because it has an apparent magnitude of 9.36, which is below the limit for naked eye visibility. At its current distance, HD 63454's brightness is diminished by two tenths of a magnitude due to interstellar dust. It has an absolute magnitude of +6.68.

Properties
HD 63454 has a stellar classification of K3 V(k), indicating that it is a K-type main-sequence star with some infilling of the calcium K and H lines. It has 79% the mass of the Sun and 80% the Sun's radius. HD 63454 has a solar metallicity and is estimated to 1.52 billion years old, a third the age of the Sun.

Planetary system 
On Valentine’s Day 2005, a hot Jupiter HD 63454 b was found by Claire Moutou, Michel Mayor, and François Bouchy using the radial velocity method.

After the 2019 IAU100 NameExoWorlds campaign, the International Astronomical Union, approved the names proposed from Uruguay: Ceibo for the star and Ibirapitá for the planet, respectively after the native Uruguayan tree species Erythrina crista-galli and Peltophorum dubium.

These names were announced on 17 December 2019, at a press conference of the IAU in Paris, together with other 111 sets of exoplanets and host stars. Ceibo and Ibirapitá were proposed by Adrián Basedas, from the Astronomical Observatory of Liceo Nº9, Montevideo, Uruguay, who won the national contest "Nombra Tu Exoplaneta", organized in Uruguay, to name HD 63454 and HD 63454 b.

See also 
 List of extrasolar planets

References

External links 
 

K-type main-sequence stars
063454
037284
Chamaeleon (constellation)
Planetary systems with one confirmed planet
CD-77 00298